is a Japanese role-playing video game developed by Studio Saizensen and published by FuRyu, developer of Unchained Blades and Last Bullet. It was released in Japan on November 7, 2013 for the Nintendo 3DS and PlayStation Vita. Due to the expiration of ClariS's music license, the game can no longer be purchased digitally on Nintendo 3DS since May 30, 2018.

Gameplay

Exstetra is a traditional role-playing video game in the vein of the Tales series, except with a turn based battle system. Characters are able to transfer energy between one another via kissing. EXS energy is obtained by defeating monsters, and is used towards special techniques. Players are also able to upgrade their weapons and armor by 'enchanting' them, and abilities become stronger depending on how many times the gear has been enchanted. Enchantment stones are able to be purchased, but can also be obtained from defeated enemies.

Story
The game's overall theme is "saving the world with a kiss". The main character, a male teenager called Ryoma, has the ability to "kiss", and, in effect, "absorb" energy from enemies, and use that energy to create "miracles". The game's setting has been described as a combination of an otherworldly fantasy land that was abruptly fused with one more like a "modern-day Tokyo", with the game depicting the repercussions of such an event.

Development
The game was first announced in a May 2013 issue of Famitsu, as a new role-playing game by FuRyu, the creators of the game Unchained Blades. The game features artwork from Shining series artist Tony Taka and Star Ocean: The Last Hope artist Enami Katsumi, and the main theme by Kingdom Hearts and Radiant Historia composer Yoko Shimomura. The game's theme song is "With You" by J-pop music duo ClariS. Originally scheduled for release on October 17, 2013, due to delays the release date was postponed to November 7.

In September 2013, Xseed Games commented that the game was an unlikely candidate to be translated into English.

Reception
Four Famitsu reviewers gave Exstetra scores of 8, 8, 7 and 7, for a total score of 30/40.

References

External links
 

2013 video games
Nintendo 3DS games
Nintendo 3DS eShop games
PlayStation Vita games
Role-playing video games
Video games developed in Japan
Japan-exclusive video games
Bishōjo games
FuRyu games
Single-player video games